Norman John MacMillan, CC, QC (1909 – 30 October 1978) was a president of Canadian National Railway.

MacMillan was born in Bracebridge, Ontario. He would study at the University of Manitoba where he graduated with a Bachelor of Arts in 1930. In 1934, he received a Bachelor of Laws.

As a career lawyer, MacMillan joined Canadian National Railways in 1937 as a solicitor in the company's Winnipeg, Manitoba office. He moved to Canadian National's Montreal office in 1943, becoming the railway's general counsel in 1945. In 1967 he became the company's President, leading the railway through a time of technological change. Before his retirement in 1974, MacMillan would see the start of construction on Toronto's CN Tower landmark.

He died in 1978 at his cottage in his birthplace community of Bracebridge. He was married with a son and a daughter.

Awards and recognition
1967: honorary Doctor of Laws from the University of Manitoba
1972: first-ever Canadian recipient of the Distinguished Service Award by American Railway Development Association
26 June 1974: appointed a Companion of the Order of Canada

Legacy

 MacMillan Yard in Vaughan, Ontario was named for him.

References

External links
Canadian National: Norman MacMillan biography

1909 births
1978 deaths
Canadian National Railway executives
Companions of the Order of Canada
People from Bracebridge, Ontario